Margherita Gonzaga may refer to:
Margherita Gonzaga, Marquise of Ferrara (1418–1439), first wife of Leonello d'Este, Marquis of Ferrara
Margaret of Bavaria, Marchioness of Mantua (1442–1479), the wife of Federico I Gonzaga, Marquess of Mantua
Margherita Gonzaga (1496–1496), daughter of Isabella d'Este and Francesco Gonzaga
Margherita Gonzaga, Duchess of Ferrara (1564–1618), also known as Margherita Gonzaga d'Este
Margherita Gonzaga, Duchess of Lorraine (1591–1632), eldest daughter of Vincenzo I Gonzaga and Eleonora de' Medici
Margherita Malatesta (1370–1399), wife of Francesco I Gonzaga
Margherita Paleologa (1510–1566), wife of Federico II Gonzaga
Margaret of Savoy, Vicereine of Portugal (1589–1655), wife of Francesco IV Gonzaga
Margherita Farnese (1567–1643), wife of Vincenzo Gonzaga, Duke of Mantua